Pouteria silvestris is a species of plant in the family Sapotaceae. It is endemic to Costa Rica.

References

Flora of Costa Rica
silvestris
Vulnerable plants
Taxonomy articles created by Polbot